The Roanoke Valley Rebels were a minor league hockey franchise in the ECHL from 1990–92. The Rebels played their games at the LancerLot in Vinton, Virginia. The Rebels played from 1983–90 as the Virginia Lancers and were renamed the Roanoke Valley Rampage after the 1991–92 season.

After two seasons of playing as the Rebels, owner Henry Brabham would sell the team to Larry Revo, and he would rename the team the Roanoke Valley Rampage.

Season-by-season results

Notable Personnel
 Claude Noel – Rebels head coach, 1990–91 season. Won the 2004 Calder Cup as head coach with the Milwaukee Admirals, interim Columbus Blue Jackets head coach in 2010, and first post-relocation head coach of the second Winnipeg Jets franchise 2011 to 2014.

External links
 Team profile at The Internet Hockey Database

Defunct ECHL teams
Sports in Roanoke, Virginia
Defunct ice hockey teams in the United States
Ice hockey teams in Virginia
Ice hockey clubs established in 1990
Sports clubs disestablished in 1992
1990 establishments in Virginia
1992 disestablishments in Virginia